Ullock Pike is a fell situated in northern part of the English Lake District. It is located seven kilometres north west of Keswick and achieves a height of 691 metres (2264 feet). The fell sits on Skiddaw’s south western ridge along with two other fells (Long Side and Carl Side), this ridge is regarded as the finest way to ascend Skiddaw, with Alfred Wainwright commenting:

‘There is no doubt in my mind that by far the best approach to the top of  Skiddaw is by way of its north-west ridge. This offers a fine expedition along a narrow crest in exciting surroundings and provides excellent views throughout … for the collector of summits here are three waiting to be picked off in addition to Skiddaw’.

Name
The fell’s name comes from the Old Norse language and translates as ‘The peak where the wolves play’. With úlfr meaning wolf and leikr meaning play, there are records that the fell was called Ulvelaik in the 13th century.

Topography
Ullock Pike drops away steeply on its eastern side to the little-known valley of Southerndale while its western slopes, which are clothed in woodland lower down, fall to Bassenthwaite Lake. When viewed from the north Ullock Pike is observed as a slender peak which catches the eye but from other directions it is seen as just a bump at the end of Longside Edge. The fell of Long Side is just 600 metres away along the ridge to the south west and Ullock Pike has just 14 metres of topographic prominence from it and therefore fails to qualify as a Hewitt or a Nuttall and relies on Wainwright to give it the status of a separate fell, which he does mainly because of the quality of the view and the excellence of its form from the north.

Ullock Pike has a low-lying outlying top, which stands 1.5 kilometres away along the northern ridge and has the unusual name of ‘Watches’. With a height of 333 metres it is a distinctive summit made more remarkable by an unusual rash of igneous rocks amongst the grass and local Skiddaw slate. These give the initial impression of being an ancient stone circle or even a small quarry but are apparently a natural rock formation.

Geology
In common with much of the Northern Fells the Kirk Stile Formation of the Skiddaw Group predominates. This is composed of laminated mudstone and siltstone with greywacke sandstone and is of Ordovician age. There are many small intrusions of lamprophyre and diorite.

Ascents
There are two possible starting points for the ascent of Ullock Pike from the north, the one from the Ravenstone Hotel at grid reference  is hampered by a lack of parking space but does have a bus stop (there is parking in Dodd Wood 1.5 km to the south). Both routes utilise the northern ridge to climb the fell. There is a significant false top which is in view for a long time before the true summit is attained.

Summit
The top of the fell is a small neat spot carpeted with heather which gives a fine all-round view even though it is curtailed by the bulk of Skiddaw to the east.

References 
 A Pictorial Guide to the Lakeland Fells, The Northern Fells, Alfred Wainwright 
 Complete Lakeland Fells, Bill Birkett, 
 Wainwright’s Favourite Lakeland Mountains, Alfred Wainwright, 
 The Mountains of England and Wales, John and Anne Nuttall, 
 Place names of the Lake District

Fells of the Lake District